The Paris Institute of Political Studies, commonly known as Sciences Po, awards honorary doctorates to individuals of foreign nationality who make outstanding contributions to academia and politics in the humanities and social sciences, notably in the fields of economics, history, law, political science, sociology. Created in 1918, the title of Doctor honoris causa is one of the most prestigious distinctions awarded by French higher education institutions to honour people of foreign nationalities because of outstanding services to science, literature or the arts, to France or to the higher education institution that awards the title.

Nomination 
Since 1974, the French Government has authorised Sciences Po to award the title of doctor honoris causa.

The decree specifies that the title of doctor honoris causa is bestowed by the President of Sciences Po to individuals of foreign nationality in instances where outstanding contributions have been made to the arts, to literature, to science and technology, in France or to Sciences Po.

This distinction may be attributed in consultation with the French Ministry for Europe and Foreign Affairs, upon proposals submitted by the university. The degree is established and signed by the president of the university.

Laureates 
Sciences Po has awarded the distinction of doctor honoris causa to twenty-four prominent figures in the academic and political worlds. In accordance with French Government guidelines, all recipients are of foreign nationality. The decision to award this distinction is rare and constitutes a great recognition for the contributions of the individual. The large number of recipients in 2006 (six laureates) is due to the celebration of the sixtieth anniversary of the National Foundation of Political Science.

See also 

 Sciences Po
 Education in France

References 

Sciences Po
Sciences Po
Sciences Po honorary doctorate laureates